The Deputy Inspector-General of Police (abbreviation: DIG) is the second most senior police rank of a senior officer in the Royal Malaysian Police (PDRM) above the rank of Commissioner of Police (CP) and below that of the Inspector-General of Police (IGP).

Deputy Inspectors-General of Police

References

Law enforcement in Malaysia